Clifford A. Ukkelberg (March 17, 1904 – March 30, 1996) was an American farmer and politician.

Ukkleberg eas born on a farm in Clitherall, Otter Tail County, Minnesota and went to the Clitherall Public Schools. He graduated from the University of Minnesota School of Agriculture in 1927. Ukkelberg lived with his wife and family in Clitherall, Minnesota and was a farmer. Ukkelberg served on the Clitherall School Board. He served in the Minnesota House of Representatives from 1955 to 1958 and in the Minnesota Senate from 1959 to 1972.

References

1904 births
1996 deaths
People from Otter Tail County, Minnesota
University of Minnesota alumni
Farmers from Minnesota
School board members in Minnesota
Members of the Minnesota House of Representatives
Minnesota state senators